Santiago Tomás Tarazona (born 31 May 1996) is an Argentine field hockey player who plays as a defender or midfielder for GEBA and the Argentine national team.

He represented Argentina at the 2020 Summer Olympics.

Club career
Tarazona started playing hockey at age eight. He played for GEBA until the 2020 Olympics when he joined Spanish División de Honor club Real Club de Polo in the summer of 2021. After one season, he returned to Argentina to prepare for the 2023 Men's FIH Hockey World Cup.

Honours
Argentina U21
 Pan American Junior Championship: 2016

Argentina
 Pan American Cup: 2017, 2022
 South American Games gold medal: 2022

References

External links
Tokyo 2020 profile

1996 births
Living people
Argentine male field hockey players
Field hockey players at the 2020 Summer Olympics
Male field hockey defenders
Male field hockey midfielders
Olympic field hockey players of Argentina
Real Club de Polo de Barcelona players
División de Honor de Hockey Hierba players
Competitors at the 2022 South American Games
South American Games gold medalists for Argentina
South American Games medalists in field hockey
21st-century Argentine people
Field hockey players from Buenos Aires
2023 Men's FIH Hockey World Cup players